The 1829 Connecticut gubernatorial election was held on April 9, 1829. Incumbent governor and National Republican nominee Gideon Tomlinson ran essentially unopposed, winning with 97.52% of the vote amidst a scattering of votes.

General election

Candidates
Major party candidates

Gideon Tomlinson, National Republican/Anti-Jacksonian

Results

References

1829
Connecticut
Gubernatorial